The J. D. Crawford Prize is a biennial award presented by the Society for Industrial and Applied Mathematics (SIAM) for achievements in the field of dynamical systems. Established in 2001, the award honors John David Crawford (1954–1998), a professor at the University of Pittsburgh who made fundamental research contributions in the field.

Recipients
The recipients of the J. D. Crawford prize are:
 Björn Sandstede (2001)
 Yannís G. Kevrekidis (2003)
 Dwight Barkley (2005)
 Andrew M. Stuart (2007)
 Arnd Scheel (2009)
 Eric Vanden-Eijnden (2011)
 Panayotis G. Kevrekidis (2013)
 Florin Diacu (2015)
 Martin Wechselberger (2017)
 Margaret Beck (2019)
 Igor Mezić (2021)

See also

 List of mathematics awards
 Prizes named after people

References 

Awards of the Society for Industrial and Applied Mathematics
American science and technology awards